I with ogonek (majuscule: Į, minuscule: į) is a letter of the Latin alphabet formed by addition of the ogonek to the letter I. It is used in Lithuanian, Western Apache, Chipewyan, Mescalero-Chiricahua, Muscogee, Dadibi, Dalecarlian, Gwichʼin, Hän, Iñapari, Kaska, Navajo, Sierra Otomi, Sekani, Tagish, Tlingit, Tutchone, Winnebago, and Ixtlán Zapotec.

Usage 
In Lithuanian, it is the 14th letter of the alphabet, and is pronounced as long close front unrounded vowel ([iː]). In the past, the letter was used to denote the nasalized close front unrounded vowel ([ĩ]). Currently, it appears in the words that used to be nasalized in the past, for example in įkalnė, which means uphill.

 was also used in the Latin alphabet of the Khakas language between 1929-1939, representing the sound . The current Cyrillic alphabet uses the dotted I for the same sound.

The letter also appears in various Indigenous languages of North America, which are: Western Apache, Chipewyan, Mescalero-Chiricahua, Muscogee, Dadibi, Dalecarlian, Gwichʼin, Hän, Iñapari, Kaska, Navajo, Sierra Otomi, Sekani, Tagish, Tlingit, Tutchone, Winnebago, and Ixtlán Zapotec. In most of them, the letter represent the nasalized close front unrounded vowel ([ĩ]).

Encoding

References 

Latin letters with diacritics